Brian Oldfield (June 1, 1945 – March 26, 2017) was an American athlete and personality of the 1970s and early 1980s. A standout shot putter, Oldfield was credited with making the rotational technique popular. With his "Oldfield spin," he set the indoor and outdoor world records in the sport many times. However, due to his status as a professional athlete, and due to the lack of official control of his achievements by athletic authorities as well as later steroid-related investigations, his records were never officially recognized.

Life and career
Oldfield was born in Elgin, Illinois, and began his career at Middle Tennessee State University where he won the Ohio Valley Conference championship three times. The University recognized his achievements by inducting him into their athletic Hall of Fame in 2000.

After holding several jobs, Oldfield set his sights on achieving stardom in the shot put as an Olympian. In 1972, he made the United States Olympic team, but finished in sixth place. He bounced back less than a year later by setting his first world record, with a throw of 21.60 m (70 ft 10½ in). However, this record was not official due to his affiliation with ITA professional track and field.

In 1975, his throw of 22.86 m (75 ft) set another unofficial world record due to him being a professional, which at that time was not allowed. Though unofficial, Oldfield's accomplishment did not go unnoticed. After setting this mark, he had earned a cover spot on Sports Illustrated, and also made an appearance in a 1975 issue of Playgirl. In his Sports Illustrated interview, he confidently asserted that he expected to be throwing over 80 ft before 1980.  In 1984, at age 38, he finally set an official record with a throw of 22.19 m (72 ft 9 in) to set a new American mark. When asked by a commentator how he was able to do it at the event, he responded, "I had a 'throw-gasm.'"

But Oldfield was perhaps at least as well known for his unconventional persona and on-field antics as he was for his athletic performance. Unusual for track athletes at the time, he wore his hair long in a style he dubbed the "Oldfield Mop" and occasionally sported a beard. Oldfield would sometimes smoke cigarettes in between throws at competitions to show that he could beat anyone, even while smoking. He was known for wearing flamboyant outfits, including tie-dyed shirts and Speedo-style shorts. These stunts served not only to raise Oldfield's profile, but frequently unnerved his opponents. At the 1972 United States Olympic Trials, an opponent was quoted as saying, "I will retire the day that I lose to someone like Brian Oldfield." Not surprising for the man who said in the September 1, 1975 Sports Illustrated article about him, "When God created man, he wanted him to look like me."

Oldfield competed in the World's Strongest Man contest in 1978, finishing seventh in a field of ten competitors. He also competed in Scottish Highland Games in the 1970s.  Utilizing his experience in the shot put, he set many field records in the Stone put. His career-best throw of 63 ft 2 in in the light stone, accomplished at Braemar, Scotland, in 1973, was a world record until 2013.

Oldfield also starred in the 1989 film Savage Instinct, later renamed They Call Me Macho Woman! as Mongo, the crazed drug lord. In the film, Oldfield wears a special spiked headgear that his character uses to head-butt people to death. The movie was unsuccessful.

Near the end of his life, injuries from his time in competition reduced the athlete to walking with a cane and using a wheelchair.

Death
Oldfield died on March 26, 2017, at his home in Elgin, aged 71.

References

External links
 
 BrianOldfield.com
 Brian Oldfield tribute video

1945 births
2017 deaths
American male shot putters
American strength athletes
American masters athletes
World record holders in masters athletics
Middle Tennessee Blue Raiders men's track and field athletes
Sportspeople from Elgin, Illinois
Sportspeople from the Chicago metropolitan area
Track and field athletes from Illinois
Athletes (track and field) at the 1972 Summer Olympics
Olympic track and field athletes of the United States